Kylie Cosmetics, LLC is an American cosmetics company founded by Kylie Jenner. The company began selling Kylie Lip Kits, a liquid lipstick and lip liner set, on November 30, 2015. Formerly known as Kylie Lip Kits, the company was renamed Kylie Cosmetics.

In 2018, Forbes reported the company was valued at $800 million, and in March 2019, valued the company at $900 million. Coty, Inc. bought a 51% controlling stake in the company for $600 million in November 2019, valuing the company at approximately $1.2 billion. However, in early 2020 Forbes reported—citing documentation from the Coty deal—that Kylie Cosmetics had overvalued itself.

Background
In 2014, Kylie Jenner and her mother Kris Jenner founded the company and partnered with Seed Beauty, a retail and product development company co-founded by siblings, John and Laura Nelson. The company's first product Kylie Lip Kits, a liquid lipstick and lip liner, debuted on November 30, 2015. The first 15,000 lip kits were produced by Seed Beauty and funded by Jenner at a cost of $250,000 from her modelling earnings. The company was renamed to Kylie Cosmetics in February 2016, and production was increased to 500,000 kits. By the end of 2016, the company's total revenue was over $300 million.

Jenner has described her decision to use her former insecurity about her lip size as inspiration for her brand, saying it's "one of the most authentic things I've done in my career".

Business

Collaborations and collections

In April 2017, Jenner announced her collaboration with her half-sister, Kim Kardashian, called KKW X Kylie. Kylie Cosmetics partnered with Kim Kardashian soon after the KKW release.

In May 2017, it was announced Koko X Kylie would be returning for a Part 2 of the half-sisters’ collaboration.

In a month long pop-up event in November 2017, seven TopShop stores across the US sold Kylie Cosmetics products. In November 2018, Kylie Cosmetics began selling their products at Ulta. Many attribute the brand's success to Jenner's cosmetically altered lips.

In April 2018, Jenner announced her Kylie Cosmetics collaboration with her oldest half-sister, Kourtney Kardashian, called Kourt X Kylie.

On May 9, 2018, Kylie and Kris Jenner announced their collaboration called the Kris Kollection via Kylie's personal Instagram. The Mini Lip Set in the Kris Kollection, which includes eight mini liquid lipsticks, is aptly named “Momager”, a title in which Kris Jenner has personally taken on, and attempted to trademark, in recent years. In addition to the "Momager" Lip Kit, the Kris Kollection includes lip glosses and a four pan pressed powder highlight/blush palette, which has created a lot of controversy online with both good and bad reviews. The collection was released just in time for Mother's Day.

In 2019, Kylie announced her collaboration with Oliver Rousteing, the creative director for Balmain in the KylieXBalmain collection. Which launched on September 27 of that year.

In 2020, Kylie Cosmetics released a collaboration with The Grinch for Christmas.

In October 2021, Kylie Cosmetics released a A Nightmare on Elm Street collaboration for Halloween.

October 19, 2022, Kylie Cosmetics will release a collaboration with Batman called Batman x Kylie.

Non-collaborative collections
In February 2018, Jenner released Kylie Cosmetics’ first non-collaborative collection: Weather. Jenner explained the collection is an ode to her daughter, Stormi, who inspired the collection and was born earlier that month.

Pop-up locations 
Kylie is known for making appearances at pop-up shops which are located inside Topshops

Packaging
In May 2016, Kylie Cosmetics changed the packaging of its Lip Kits due to complaints of theft. Due to the easily recognizable packaging and high demand for the product at the time, some customers received empty boxes after having their products stolen in the mailing process. The original Kylie Lip Kit box was black with a white lip gloss drip design. In order to solve the theft issue, the boxes were changed to a basic black, and the recognizable lip gloss design was moved to the inside of the box.

In the April 2018 release of the Kourt X Kylie Collection, Kylie Cosmetics included eyeshadow palettes with brand new plastic packaging rather than the traditional cardboard packaging.

Marketing

While Jenner, or members of her family, often serve as the face of Kylie Cosmetics, the pair of lips that advertise the Lip Kits themselves belongs to beauty and lifestyle blogger Ashley Rosales. Before entering the beauty community, Ashley Rosales served in the United States Army as a mechanic.

Jenner revealed that she has enlisted her housekeeper and her boyfriend Travis Scott to model swatches of the makeup on their arms for social media advertisements.

Criticism

"Luxury" brush scandal
In an occurrence dubbed by Cosmopolitan Australia as the "Kylie makeup brush scandal of 2017", Jenner received backlash from fans, makeup gurus, and Internet users alike after Kylie Cosmetics launched a set of 16 luxury makeup brushes, priced at $360. After a few prominent YouTubers, including James Charles and Jeffree Star weighed in with their negative opinions on the price of the brush kit, Jenner responded via her personal Twitter, telling fans, "I hear you guys".

Skin Concealer controversy
After the release of the concealer line, Skin Concealer, Kylie Cosmetics received negative feedback from Internet users who claimed the company was copying Rihanna’s makeup line, Fenty Beauty. Though the intention of the makeup line was to remain inclusive, it was assumed by some that Jenner was profiting from diversity by including 30 shades in her concealer line.

It was also observed that all of the darker shades had red undertones, as explicitly described on the Kylie Cosmetics website, prompting the criticism that it did not cater to all skin types.

Eyeshadow Palette controversy 
Back in 2017, Kylie Cosmetics received backlash after clients began reporting a strange and concerning smell from the brand's Royal Peach Eyeshadow Palette. This pungent smell was described as having a "chemical and glue" smell, with many comparing it to "spray paint" and "paint thinner".

"Provocative" blushes
The release of Kylie Cosmetics' March 2018 line of blushes sparked anger among some fans who thought that the names of some of the new products, such as "Barely Legal", "Virginity", "X Rated", and "Hot and Bothered", were too provocative, especially for Jenner's younger fans.

Company overvaluation 
On April 8, 2020, Forbes again named Jenner as the world's youngest "self made" billionaire, citing her net worth having increased to $1.2 billion. However, in May, Forbes released a statement accusing Jenner of forging tax documents so she would appear as a billionaire. The publication also accused her of fabricating revenue figures for Kylie Cosmetics, citing documents Coty Inc (which had acquired a majority stake in Kylie Cosmetics) had released. The Forbes article concluded that Kylie Cosmetics was significantly smaller and less profitable than previously reported.

Safety 
Some Kylie Cosmetics products include perfumes, which have been known to cause asthmatic reactions in some individuals.

See also
 ColourPop Cosmetics
 The Kardashians

References

Cosmetics brands
American companies established in 2014
Chemical companies established in 2014
Cosmetics companies of the United States
Companies based in Oxnard, California